2018–19 UAE Division one (stylized as UAE Division 1) was the 43rd Division one season. Team changes for the season include Al Taawon who joined the league to replace Ras Al Khaimah who withdrew due to financial reasons, while Hatta was relegated from the UAE Pro League last year and the top 3 teams of last year's season (Baniyas, Kalba and Fujairah), were all promoted to the Pro League.

Team Changes

To Division 1  
Relegated from UAE Pro League
Hatta

Rejoined after withdrawal
Al Taawon

From Division 1 
Promoted to UAE Pro League
Baniyas
Kalba
Fujairah

Teams that withdrew 
Ras Al Khaimah

Stadia and locations

''Note: Table lists clubs in alphabetical order.

Number of teams by Emirates

Personnel and kits
Note: Flags indicate national team as has been defined under FIFA eligibility rules. Players may hold more than one non-FIFA nationality.

Managerial changes

League table

Results

References

UAE
2018–19 in Emirati football